Hong Kong-style milk tea is a tea drink made from Ceylon black tea and milk (usually evaporated milk and condensed milk). It is usually part of lunch in Hong Kong tea culture. Hongkongers consume approximately a total of 900 million glasses/cups per year. Although originating from Hong Kong, it can also be found overseas in restaurants serving Hong Kong cuisine and Hong Kong-style western cuisine. In the show Top Eat 100, which aired on 4 February 2012, Hong Kong-style milk tea was listed as the 4th most popular food/drink in Hong Kong. The unique tea making technique is listed on the representative list of the Intangible Cultural Heritage of Hong Kong.

History
Hong Kong-style milk tea originates from British colonial rule over Hong Kong. The British practice of afternoon tea, where black tea is served with milk and sugar, grew popular in Hong Kong. Milk tea is the same except with evaporated or condensed milk substituted for traditional milk.

A dai pai dong-style restaurant called Lan Fong Yuen (蘭芳園) claims both silk-stocking milk tea and Yuenyeung were invented in 1952 by its owner Mr. Lam. Its claim for the latter is unverified, but that for the former is on the record in the official minutes of a Legislative Council of Hong Kong meeting from 2007, lending it significant plausibility.

It is called "milk tea" to distinguish it from "Chinese tea", which is served plain. Outside of Hong Kong it is referred to as "Hong Kong-style milk tea". It has another name, "silk stocking milk tea" which originates from the appearance of the sackcloth tea leaf filter bag. In the 1950s and 1960s, the main customers of Hong Kong style milk tea were workers and labourers, who thought that the sackcloth looked like pantyhose.

Cultural heritage 
In 2017, the Leisure and Cultural Services Department of Hong Kong declared "Hong Kong-style milk tea making technique" as one of the intangible cultural heritages (ICH) of Hong Kong, under the domain "traditional craftsmanship" as specified by UNESCO Convention for the Safeguarding of the ICH.

Preparation

Hong Kong-style milk tea is made of a mix of several types of black tea (in the Western sense, often Ceylon tea), possibly pu'er tea, evaporated milk, and sugar, the last of which is added by the customer unless in the case of take-away. The proportion of each tea type is treated as a commercial secret by many vendors. Cha jau is a variation that uses condensed milk instead of milk and sugar, giving the tea a richer feel. Still other cafés prefer using a filled milk variant, which is a combination of skim milk and soybean oil.

The key feature of Hong Kong-style milk tea is that a sackcloth bag is used to filter the tea leaves. However any other filter/strainer may be used to filter the tea. Sackcloth bags are not necessary but generally preferred. The bag, reputed to make the tea smoother, gradually develops an intense brown colour as a result of prolonged tea steeping. Together with the shape of the filter, it resembles a silk stocking, giving Hong Kong-style milk tea the nickname of "pantyhose" or "silk stocking" milk tea. This nickname is used in Hong Kong but less so in mainland China and overseas communities.

There is some debate over the most authentic way of making milk tea, i.e. the sequence of adding each ingredient. Some have argued that milk should be added before pouring the tea, while others hold the opposite view. Though, to most people, both methods are acceptable.

Milk tea is a popular part of many Hongkongers' daily lives, typically served as part of afternoon tea but also at breakfast or dinner. It enjoys nearly the same ubiquitous status that coffee holds in the West. Whilst not offered by more traditional Cantonese restaurants or dim sum teahouses, milk tea is standard fare in Hong Kong-style western restaurants and cha chaan teng, as well as Hong Kong's historic dai pai dong, with a price between HKD$12–16 for a hot serving and two to three dollars more for a cold serving. A cup of hot milk tea is usually either served in a ceramic cup (often referred to as a "coffee cup" 咖啡杯) a tall cylindrical glass, or a metal cup.

The first criterion of a good cup of milk tea is its "smoothness" (香滑); in other words, how creamy and full-bodied it is. Another criterion for tasty milk tea (and also bubble tea) is some white frothy residue inside the lip of the cup after some of it has been drunk. This white froth means that the concentration of butterfat in the evaporated milk used is high enough. There is also another way for locals to distinguish high quality by identifying hints of oil on top of the drink after it has been properly brewed. This is the oil remains from the roasting process during tea production.

Varieties

Iced milk tea is usually prepared with ice cubes. However, in the past when ice-making machines were not common, the iced milk tea was made by filling the hot milk tea into a glass bottle and then cooled in a refrigerator. In the past, milk tea was sold in Vitasoy or Coca-Cola bottles. Today this type of "bottle milk tea" is rare in Hong Kong. Iced milk tea in cans or plastic bottles can be found in many of the convenience stores around Hong Kong such as 7-Eleven and Circle K.

In the case of milk tea with ice cubes, the melting ice will dilute the content, thus affecting the taste of the drink. Some cha chaan tengs serve ice-less iced milk tea, made by pouring hot milk tea into a plastic cup and then cooling it in a refrigerator or by placing the container into a cold water bath, which is called "ice bath milk tea". Some restaurants simply use ice cubes made of frozen milk tea. All these methods are often used as selling points.

Milk tea and coffee together is called Yuenyeung. A variation on "silk stocking tea" is "silk stocking coffee".

See also
 Hong Kong cuisine
 Milk tea
 Teh tarik
Milk Tea Alliance

References

External links

Association of Coffee & Tea Hong Kong 

Blended tea
Hong Kong cuisine
Hong Kong drinks
Tea culture
Milk tea